La Voz Colombia (Spanish for The Voice Colombia) is a reality television singing competition, originating from the dutch version, which has become a worldwide phenomenon. Over 50 countries now have their own version of The Voice. In this show, Colombians with outstanding singing talent are sought, and will be coached by four great music superstars who will be in charge of finding and training the next "voice" of Colombia.

The first season premiered on Caracol TV on October 1, 2012. For the second season, The Voice Colombia has a Second Screen TV Application, developed by Applicaster.   The app offers an aggregated live feed of both broadcaster driven activities and social networks integration. The activities include a variety of gamification events, behind the scenes exclusive content, and various layers of information, to enhance primetime viewership. Show-related tweets and Facebook posts are integrated into the TV app feed during live primetime shows. Parlar TV, Caracol TV's app is available on the app store and on Google Play.

The winner of season 1 was Miranda Cardona and the winner of Season 2 was Camilo Martinez.

Format
Participants attempt their shot at the competition in blind auditions, where the judges and future coaches, sit with their backs to the contestants.  This format allows the participants to be judged solely on their singing ability and not on physical appearance.  Judges can turn their chairs at the press of a button, indicating that they are interested in the performer.  If more than one judge turns his/her chair, the contestant can choose a judge who will then become their coach as well.  This format is based on the talent show The Voice.

At the second stage, The Battles, coaches are forced to reduce their team by half. They have to pit two of their contestants to sing against each other in a ring. In the end each coach made the decision to eliminate one of them, who left the competition. In this phase, coaches are supported by guest advisors.

The third stage is the live shows, which are broadcast live. Each contestant must sing for the coaches. At the end of the show, each coach will be obliged to saves one from his/her team. The elimination consists of the two nominees at risk each week, the audience save one of the nominees and the other two will sing the song with which they performed in the show. The coach will eliminate one. The elimination procedure continues until there is one artists per team in the final. In the second season, the Live Shows had format changed and any coach could have no finalist in the final.

Due to a clause in the contract between Caracol and Talpa (producer that owns the format), the program is not broadcast internationally, with the exception of Spain and Ecuador, due to a special cause.

The first season of the show released a compilation CD, Lo Mejor de La Voz Colombia ("The Best of The Voice Colombia"), recorded by 12 of the contestants, and was put on sale in the country, where it was certified platinum.

Thanks to the excellent performance of The Voice Colombia in Ecuador,  Ecuavisa aired the first season of The Voice Colombia and was one of the only The Voice versions to be transmitted outside the originating country.

Coaches and hosts
In the first season Carlos Vives, Ricardo Montaner, Andrés Cepeda and Fanny Lu were the coaches, while battle advisors were Maia, MR (Mau and Ricky Montaner), Amaury Gutiérrez, and Gilberto Santa Rosa. For the second season, Carlos Vives announced that due to several tours and prior commitments he would not return, for which "The gentleman of salsa" Gilberto Santa Rosa replaced him on the coaching panel.

The show was hosted by Carlos Ponce, Linda Palma and Diego Sáenz in season 1. Alejandro Palacio replaced Ponce in season 2.

Coaches' advisors

Coaches' teams 
  – Winner
  – Runner-up 
  – Third place 
  – Fourth place

Season summary

Kids edition 
 La Voz Kids is a Colombian kids talent show, based on the Dutch competition The Voice Kids, broadcast by Caracol Television. In each season, contestants are trained by one of the three coaches, competing to win COL$300 million and a contract with Universal Music. Participation is only open to children aged from 6 to 15. As of September 2022, information on season 7 has yet to be revealed.

Format 
The format of La Voz Kids  share the same blind audition rules from the adult's version. However, in the battles, three participants from the same team are put against each other and only one advances to the next stage. The next stage is the superbattles, where the teams are reduced again. Each coach must organize battles and choose 3 or 2 participants of their team to face each other. Each contestant will be assigned a different song. After that, each coach will have 5 participants to the live shows and a contestant will leave until the three finalists, one from each team, remain in the final.

Starting from the second season of La Voz Kids, participants who are eliminated in the super battles round have the opportunity to return to the competition. Each contestant will sing for the coaches with a free-choice song. In the end, six contestants enter again and can choose the coach they want to go with.

Coaches and hosts 
 For La Voz Kids, the coaching panel consists of two coaches from the adult version, Andrés Cepeda and Fanny Lu, and then having its own coach, Maluma. In season three, Maluma was replaced by Sebastián Yatra. The show was hosted by Alejandro Palacio and Linda Palma in the first two seasons. Laura Tobón replaced Palma from season three onward. Laura Acuña replaced Palacio for season five. Ivan Lalinde replaced Tobon for season six.

Teens edition 
 La Voz Teens was the first-ever teens' version on The Voice franchise. The difference from the kids' versions is that participation was only open to singers between the ages of 13 and 17. In 2016, the first and, so far, only season premiered.

Format 
The format of La Voz Teens  share the same blind audition rules from the adult's version. However, in the battles, three participants from the same team are put against each other and only one advances to the next stage. The next stage is the superbattles, where the teams are reduced again. Each coach must organize battles and choose 3 or 2 participants of their team to face each other. Each contestant will be assigned a different song. After that, each coach will have 5 participants to the live shows and a contestant will leave until the three finalists, one from each team, remain in the final.

Coaches and hosts

Senior edition

La Voz Kids & La Voz Teens 

 For La Voz Teens, Cepeda was part of the coaching panel, along with Venezuelan singer Gusi, and ChocQuibTown singer Gloria Martinez. The hosts were Tubón and Karen Martínez, with Catalina Uribe on the backstage.

Coaches' timeline

Coaches and finalists
 – Winning coach & contestant. 
 – Runner-up coach & contestant.
 – Third place coach & contestant.

 Winners are in bold, remaining finalists in italic, and eliminated contestants in small font.

Season summary

La Voz Senior
La Voz Senior is new edition in Colombia to premiere on September 20, 2021  under Caracol TV. Based on the Dutch competition, The Voice Senior, the show is only for singers over the age of 60. Auditions for the first season were announced through the official website and other social media accounts along with the comeback of La Voz Kids. Coaches for the first season were Andrés Cepeda, Natalia Jiménez and Jesus Navarro. The show is presented by Laura Tobón and Laura Acuña.

Coaches' timeline

Series overview

Reception

Accolades

See also
 La voz Kids (Colombia) in 
 La Voz Teens (Colombia) in

References

External links
 The website of La Voz Colombia 
 Latest news from La Voz Colombia 

Colombia
2012 Colombian television series debuts